Polina Zakaluzny (born February 21, 1992) is an Israeli rhythmic gymnast.

She and her Israeli teammates placed 5th in the 2009 World Rhythmic Gymnastics Championships in both Hoops and All-Around in Mie, Japan.

She won a bronze medal at the 2011 World Rhythmic Gymnastics Championships, Women's Groups 2 hoops + 3 ribbons, in September 2011 in Montpellier, France.

References

External links
 

Israeli rhythmic gymnasts
Living people
1992 births
Gymnasts at the 2012 Summer Olympics
Olympic gymnasts of Israel
Medalists at the Rhythmic Gymnastics World Championships
Israeli people of Ukrainian-Jewish descent
Jewish gymnasts